Gianni Petrus Cornelis Romme (born 12 February 1973) is a Dutch marathoner and a former long track speed skater. He won two gold medals at the 1998 Winter Olympics in Nagano and was the World all-round champion in 2000 and 2003. Romme has been a coach since the 2006–07 speed skating season.

Career
During his long track career, Romme prevailed in long distances (5000 and 10000 metres). His greatest triumphs came at the 1998 Winter Olympics, where he won both events. Four years later, at the 2002 Winter Olympics, he captured the silver medal in the 10000 metre event, beaten only by compatriot Jochem Uytdehaage.

He has also won numerous gold medals at the World Single Distance Championships in both the 5000 m and the 10000 m, was two times World Allround Champion, and spent some time (118 days in total) at the top of the all-time world ranking, the Adelskalender.

As of 2006–07, Romme started his own coaching career. International speed skaters Anni Friesinger, Ralf van der Rijst and Risto Rosendahl decided to join his team. Romme himself wanted to continue his career, but announced at the opening day of the 2007 KNSB Dutch Single Distance Championships that he would no longer participate in long track speed skating, only in marathon speed skating.

Records

Personal records

Source: www.isu.org & SpeedskatingResults.com

Gianni Romme has an Adelskalender score of 149.570 points.

World records

Tournament overview

Source:
 DQ = Disqualified
 DNQ = Did not qualify for the distance
 NC = No classification
 DNS = Did not start

World Cup overview

Source:
– = Did not participate
* = 10000m
(b) = Division B

Medals won

References

External links

 Official site
Gianni Romme at SpeedSkatingStats.com
Photos of Gianni Romme

1973 births
Living people
Dutch male speed skaters
Speed skaters at the 1998 Winter Olympics
Speed skaters at the 2002 Winter Olympics
Olympic speed skaters of the Netherlands
Olympic gold medalists for the Netherlands
Olympic silver medalists for the Netherlands
People from Drimmelen
Olympic medalists in speed skating
World record setters in speed skating
Medalists at the 2002 Winter Olympics
Medalists at the 1998 Winter Olympics
World Allround Speed Skating Championships medalists
World Single Distances Speed Skating Championships medalists
Dutch speed skating coaches
Dutch sports coaches
Sportspeople from North Brabant